Baroque architecture is a highly decorative and theatrical style which appeared in Italy in the early 17th century and gradually spread across Europe. It was originally introduced by the Catholic Church, particularly by the Jesuits, as a means to combat the Reformation and the Protestant church with a new architecture that inspired surprise and awe. It reached its peak in the High Baroque (1625–1675), when it was used in churches and palaces in Italy, Spain, Portugal, France, Bavaria and Austria. In the Late Baroque period (1675–1750), it reached as far as Russia and the Spanish and Portuguese colonies in Latin America. About 1730, an even more elaborately decorative variant called Rococo appeared and flourished in Central Europe.

Baroque architects took the basic elements of Renaissance architecture, including domes and colonnades, and made them higher, grander, more decorated, and more dramatic.  The interior effects were often achieved with the use of quadratura, or trompe-l'œil painting combined with sculpture; the eye is drawn upward, giving the illusion that one is looking into the heavens. Clusters of sculpted angels and painted figures crowd the ceiling.  Light was also used for dramatic effect; it streamed down from Cupolas, and was reflected from an abundance of gilding. Twisted columns were also often used, to give an illusion of upwards motion, and cartouches and other decorative elements occupied every available space. In Baroque palaces, grand stairways became a central element.

The Early Baroque (1584–1625) was largely dominated by the work of Roman architects, notably the Church of the Gesù by Giacomo della Porta (consecrated 1584) facade and colonnade of St. Peter's Basilica by Carlo Maderno (completed 1612) and the lavish Barberini Palace interiors by Pietro da Cortona (1633–1639). Church of the Gesù by Giacomo della Porta (consecrated 1584), interior, and Santa Susanna (1603), by Carlo Maderno.  In France, the Luxembourg Palace (1615–45) built by Salomon de Brosse for Marie de Medici was an early example of the style.

The  High Baroque (1625–1675) produced major works in Rome by Pietro da Cortona, including the (Church of Santi Luca e Martina) (1635–50); by Francesco Borromini (San Carlo alle Quattro Fontane (1634–1646)); and by Gian Lorenzo Bernini (The colonnade of St. Peter's Basilica) (1656–57).  In Venice, High Baroque works included Santa Maria della Salute by Baldassare Longhena. Examples in France included the Pavillon de l’Horloge of the Louvre Palace by Jacques Lemercier (1624–1645), the Chapel of the Sorbonne by Jacques Lemercier (1626–35) and the Château de Maisons by François Mansart (1630–1651).

The Late Baroque (1675–1750) saw the style spread to all parts of Europe, and to the colonies of Spain and Portugal in the New World. National styles became more varied and distinct.  The Late Baroque in France, under Louis XIV, was more ordered and classical; examples included the Hall of Mirrors of the Palace of Versailles and the dome of Les Invalides. An especially ornate variant, appeared in the early 18th century; it was first called Rocaille in France; then Rococo in Spain and Central Europe. The sculpted and painted decoration covered every space on the walls and ceiling. Its most celebrated architect was Balthasar Neumann, noted for the Basilica of the Fourteen Holy Helpers and the Würzburg Residence (1749–51).

History

Early Baroque (1584–1625) 

Baroque architecture first appeared in the late 16th and early 17th century in religious architecture in Rome a means to counter the popular appeal of the Protestant Reformation.  It was a reaction against the more severe and academic earlier style of earlier churches, it aimed to inspire the common people with the effects of surprise, emotion and awe. To achieve this, it used a combination of contrast, movement, trompe-l'œil and other dramatic and theatrical effects, such as quadratura  the use of painted ceilings that gave the illusion that one was looking up directly at the sky. The new style was particularly favored by the new religious orders, including the Theatines and the Jesuits, who built new churches designed to attract and inspire a wide popular audience.

Rome
One of the first Baroque architects, Carlo Maderno, used Baroque effects of space and perspective in the new facade and colonnade of Saint Peter's Basilica, which was designed to contrast with and complement the gigantic dome built earlier by Michelangelo. Other influential early examples in Rome included the Church of the Gesù by Giacomo della Porta (consecrated 1584), with the first Baroque facade and a highly ornate interior, and Santa Susanna (1603), by Carlo Maderno.

Paris
The Jesuits soon imported the style to Paris. The Church of Saint-Gervais-Saint-Protais in Paris (1615–1621) had the first Baroque facade in France, the first facade in France, featuring, like the Italian Baroque facades, the three superimposed classical orders. The Italian style of palaces was also imported to Paris by Marie de Medici for her new residence, the Luxembourg Palace (1615–1624) by architect Salomon de Brosse, and for a new wing of the Chateau of Blois by Francois Mansard (1635–38). Nicolas Fouquet, the superintendent of finances for the young King Louis XIV, chose the new style for his château at Vaux-le-Vicomte (1612–1670) by Louis Le Vau.  He was later imprisoned by the King because of the extravagant cost of the palace.

Central Europe
The first example of early Baroque in Central Europe was the Corpus Christi Church, Nesvizh in the Polish–Lithuanian Commonwealth, built by the Jesuits on the Roman model between 1586 and 1593 in Nieśwież (after 1945 Niasvizh in Belarus). The church also holds a distinction of being the first domed basilica with a Baroque façade in the Commonwealth and Eastern Europe.
Another early example in Poland is the Church of Saints Peter and Paul Church, Kraków, built between 1597 and 1619 by the Italian Jesuit architect Giovanni Maria Bernardoni.

High Baroque (1625–1675)

Italy

Pope Urban VIII, who occupied the Papacy from 1623 to 1644, became the most influential patron of the Baroque style.  After the death of Carlo Maderno in 1629, Urban named the architect and sculptor Gian Lorenzo Bernini as the chief Papal architect. Bernini created not only Baroque buildings, but also Baroque interiors, squares and fountains, transforming the center of Rome into an enormous theater. Bernini rebuilt the Church of Santa Bibiana and the Church of San Sebastiano al Palatino on the Palatine Hill into Baroque landmarks, planned the Fontana del Tritone in the Piazza Barberini, and created the soaring baldacchino as the centerpiece St Peter's Basilica.

The High Baroque spread gradually across Italy, beyond Rome.  The period saw the construction of Santa Maria della Salute by Baldassare Longhena in Venice (1630–31).  Churches were not the only buildings to use the Baroque style.  One of the finest monuments of the early Baroque is the Barberini Palace (1626–1629), the residence of the family of Urban VIII, begun by Carlo Maderno, and completed and decorated by Bernini and Francesco Borromini. The outside of the Pope's family residence, was relatively restrained, but the interiors, and especially the immense fresco on the ceiling of the salon, the  Allegory of Divine Providence and Barberini Power painted by Pietro da Cortona, are considered masterpieces of Baroque art and decoration. Curving facades and the illusion of movement were a speciality of Francesco Borromini, most notably in San Carlo alle Quattro Fontane (1634–1646), one of the landmarks of the high Baroque. Another important monument of the period was the Church of Santi Luca e Martina in Rome by Pietro da Cortona (1635–50), in the form of a Greek cross with an elegant dome. After the death or Urban VIII and the brief reign of his successor, the Papacy of Pope Alexander VII from 1666 until 1667 saw more construction of Baroque churches, squares and fountains in Rome by Carlo Rainaldi, Bernini and Carlo Fontana.

France

King Louis XIII had sent the architect Jacques Lemercier to Rome between 1607 and 1614 to study the new style. On his return to France, he designed the Pavillon de l’Horloge of the Louvre Palace (beginning 1626), and, more importantly, the Church of the Sorbonne, the first church dome in Paris. It was designed in 1626, and construction began in 1635. The next important French Baroque project was a much larger dome for the church of Val-de-Grace begun in 1645 by Lemercier and François Mansart, and finished in 1715.  A third Baroque dome was soon added for the College of the Four Nations (now the Institut de France).

In 1661, following the death of Cardinal Mazarin, the young Louis XIV took direct charge of the government.  The arts were put under the direction of his controller of finance, Jean-Baptiste Colbert. Charles Le Brun, director of the Royal Academy of Painting and Sculpture, was named Superintendent of Buildings of the King, in charge of all royal architectural projects. The Royal Academy of Architecture was founded in 1671, with the mission of making Paris, not Rome, the artistic and architectural model for the world.

The first architectural project of Louis XIV was a proposed reconstruction of the facade of the east wing of the Louvre Palace. Bernini, then Europe's most famous architect, was summoned to Paris to submit a project.  Beginning in 1664, Bernini proposed several Baroque variants, but in the end the King selected a design by a French architect, Charles Perrault, in a more classical variant of Baroque.  This gradually became the Louis XIV style.  Louis was soon engaged in an even larger project, the construction of the new Palace of Versailles.  The architects chosen were Louis Le Vau and Jules Hardouin-Mansart, and the facades of the new palace were constructed around the earlier Marble Court between 1668 and 1678.  The Baroque grandeur of Versailles, particularly the facade facing the garden and the Hall of Mirrors by Jules Hardouin-Mansart, became models for other palaces across Europe.

Late Baroque (1675–1750) 

During the period of the Late Baroque (1675–1750), the style appeared across Europe, from England and France to Central Europe and Russia, from Spain and Portugal to Scandinavia, and in the colonies of Spain and Portugal in the New World and the Philippines.  It often took different names, and the regional variations became more distinct.  A particularly ornate variant appeared in the early 18th century, called Rocaille in France and Rococo in Spain and Central Europe.  The sculpted and painted decoration covering every space on the walls and ceiling.  The most prominent architects of this style included Balthasar Neumann, noted for the Basilica of the Fourteen Holy Helpers and the Wurzburg Residence (1749–51).  These works were among the final expressions of the Rococo or the Late Baroque.

Italy 

By the early 18th century, Baroque buildings could be found in all parts of Italy, often with regional variations. Notable examples included the Basilica of Superga, overlooking Turin, by Filippo Juvarra (1717–1731), which was later used as model for the Panthéon in Paris.  The Stupinigi Palace (1729–31) was a hunting lodge and one of the Residences of the Royal House of Savoy near Turin. It was also built Filippo Juvarra.

France
 

The Late Baroque period in France saw the evolving decoration of the Palace of Versailles, including the Hall of Mirrors and the Chapel.  Later in the period, during the reign of Louis XV, a new, more ornate variant, the Rocaille style, or French Rococo, appeared in Paris and flourished between about 1723 and 1759. The most prominent example was the salon of the Princess in Hôtel de Soubise in Paris, designed by Germain Boffrand and Charles-Joseph Natoire (1735–40).

England

Christopher Wren was the leading figure of the late Baroque in England, with his reconstruction of St. Paul's Cathedral (1675–1711) inspired by the model of St. Peter's Basilica in Rome, his plan for Greenwich Hospital (begun 1695), and Hampton Court Palace (1690–96). Other British figures of the late Baroque included Inigo Jones for Wilton House (1632–1647 and two pupils of Wren, John Vanbrugh and Nicholas Hawksmoor, for Castle Howard (1699–1712) and Blenheim Palace (1705–1724).

Lithuania

In the 17th century Late Baroque style buildings in Lithuania were built in an Italian Baroque style, however in the first half of the 18th century a distinctive Vilnian Baroque architectural style of the Late Baroque was formed in capital Vilnius (in which architecture was taught at Vilnius Jesuit Academy, Jesuits colleges, Dominican schools) and spread throughout Lithuania. The most distinctive features of churches built in the Vilnian Baroque style are very tall and slender towers of the main façades with differently decorated compartments, undulation of cornices and walls, decorativeness in bright colors, and multi-colored marble and stucco altars in the interiors. The Lithuanian nobility funded renovations and constructions of Late Baroque churches, monasteries (e.g. Pažaislis Monastery) and their personal palaces (e.g. Sapieha Palace, Slushko Palace, Minor Radvilos Palace).

Notable architects who built buildings in a Late Baroque style in Lithuania are Johann Christoph Glaubitz, Thomas Zebrowski, Pietro Perti (cooperated with painters Michelangelo Palloni, Giovanni Maria Galli), Giambattista Frediani, Pietro Puttini, Carlo Puttini, Jan Zaor, G. Lenkiewicz, Abraham Würtzner, Jan Valentinus Tobias Dyderszteyn, P. I. Hofer, etc.

Central Europe
Many of the most extraordinary buildings of the Late Baroque were constructed in Austria, Germany, and Czechia. In Austria, the leading figure was Fischer von Erlach, who built the Karlskirche, the largest church of Vienna, to glorify the Austrian Emperors. These works sometimes borrowed elements from Versailles combined with elements of the Italian Baroque to create grandiose new effects, as in the Schwarzenberg Palace (1715). Johann Lukas von Hildebrandt used grand stairways and ellipses to achieve his effects at the upper and lower Belvedere Palace in Vienna (1714–1722).  In The Abbey of Melk, Jakob Prandtauer used an abundance of polychrome marble and stucco, statuary and ceiling paintings to achieve harmonious and highly theatrical effects.

Another important figure of German Baroque was Balthasar Neumann (1687–1753), whose works included the Würzburg Residence for the Prince-Bishops at Würzburg, with its famous staircase.

In Bohemia, the leading Baroque architect was Christoph Dientzenhofer, whose building featured complex curves and counter-curves and elliptical forms, making Prague, like Vienna, a capital of the late Baroque.

Spain

Political and economic crises in the 17th century largely delayed the arrival of the Baroque in Span until the late period, though the Jesuits strongly promoted it.  Its early characteristics were a lavish exterior contrasting with a relatively simple interior and multiple spaces. They carefully planned lighting in the interior to give an impression of mystery. Early 18th century, Notable Spanish examples included the new west facade of Santiago de Compostela Cathedral, (1738–50), with its spectacular towers, by Fernando de Casas Novoa. In Seville, Leonardo de Figueroa was the creator of the College of San Telmo, with a facade inspired by Italian Baroque.  The most ornate works of the Spanish Baroque were made by Jose Benito de Churriguera in Madrid and Salamanca.  In his work, the buildings are nearly overwhelmed by the ornament of gilded wood, gigantic twisting columns, and sculpted vegetation. His two brothers, Joaquin and Alberto, also made important, if less ornamented, contributions to what became known simply as the Churrigueresque style.

Latin America and North America

The Baroque style was imported into Latin America in the 17th century by the Spanish and the Portuguese, particularly by the Jesuits for the construction of churches. The style was sometimes called Churrigueresque, after the family of Baroque architects in Salamanca.  A particularly fine example is Zacatecas Cathedral in Zacatecas City, in north-central Mexico, with its lavishly sculpted facade and twin bell towers. Another important example is San Cristobal de las Casas in Mexico. A notable example in Brazil is the Monastery of Sao Bento in Rio de Janeiro. begun in 1617, with additional decoration after 1668.  The Metropolitan Tabernacle the Mexico City Metropolitan Cathedral, to the right of the main cathedral, built by Lorenzo Rodríguez between 1749 and 1760, to house the archives and vestments of the archbishop, and to receive visitors.

Portuguese colonial architecture was modeled after the architecture of Lisbon, different from the Spanish style. The most notable architect in Brazil was Aleijadinho, who was native of Brazil, half-Portuguese, and self-taught. His most famous work is the Church of Saint Francis of Assisi in Ouro Preto.

Characteristics

Baroque architecture often used visual and theatrical effects, designed to surprise and awe the viewer:
  domes were a common feature. Their interiors were often painted with a sky filled with angels and sculpted sunbeams, suggesting glory or a vision of heaven. Pear-shaped domes were sometimes used in the Bavarian, Czech, Polish and Ukrainian Baroque
  quadratura.  Paintings in trompe-l'œil of angels and saints in the dome and on the ceiling, combined with stucco frames or decoration, which give the illusion of three dimensions, and of looking through the ceiling to the heavens. Sometimes painted or sculpted figures of Atlantes appear to be holding up the ceiling.  In some Baroque churches, illusionistic ceiling painting gave the illusion of three dimensions. 
  grand stairways.  Stairways often occupied a central place and were used for dramatic effect. winding upwards in stages, giving changing views from different levels, serving as a setting for ceremonies.
  cartouche in elaborate forms and sculpted frames break up the surfaces and add three-dimensional effects to the walls. 
  mirrors to give the impression of depth and greater space, particularly when combined with windows, as in the Hall of Mirrors at the Palace of Versailles.
  incomplete architectural elements, such as frontons with sections missing, causing sections to merge and disorienting the eye.
  chiaroscuro. Use of strong contrasts of darkness and light for dramatic effect. 
  overhead sculpture. Putti or figures on or just below the ceiling, made of wood (often gilded), plaster or stucco, marble or faux finishing, giving the impression of floating in the air.
  Solomonic columns, which gave an illusion of motion.
  elliptical or oval spaces, eliminating right angles.  Sometimes an oval nave was surrounded by radiating circular chapels.  This was a distinctive feature of the Basilica of the Fourteen Holy Helpers of Balthasar Neumann.

Plans

Major Baroque architects and works, by country

Italy
 
 Carlo Maderno – Santa Susanna (1595–603); St. Peter's Basilica and Sant'Andrea della Valle, Rome 
 Pietro da Cortona – Santa Maria della Pace (1656–68), Santi Luca e Martina, Rome
 Gian Lorenzo Bernini – Saint Peter's Square, Palazzo Barberini, Sant'Andrea al Quirinale, Rome 
 Francesco Borromini – San Carlo alle Quattro Fontane, Sant'Ivo alla Sapienza, Rome 
 Carlo Fontana – San Marcello al Corso (1692–1697)
 Francesco de Sanctis – Spanish Steps (1723)
 Luigi Vanvitelli – Caserta Palace (begun 1752)
 Guarino Guarini – Palazzo Carignano in Turin (1679), Chapel of the Holy Shroud, Turin 
 Filippo Juvarra  – Basilica of Superga, Turin (1717–31)

France 
 
 Salomon de Brosse – Luxembourg Palace (1615–1645)
 Louis Le Vau – (Vaux-le-Vicomte) (1658–1661), Collège des Quatre-Nations (1662–1688), Cour Carrée of the Louvre Palace (1668–1680)
 Jules Hardouin-Mansart – domed chapel of Les Invalides (finished 1708); Garden facade and began Hall of Mirrors of Palace of Versailles 
 Robert de Cotte – Chapel of Palace of Versailles (1643–1715), Grand Trianon (1643–1715)

England 

 Christopher Wren –   St. Paul's Cathedral (1675–1711), Hampton Court Palace (1690–1696), Greenwich Hospital (begun 1695)
 Nicholas Hawksmoor and John Vanbrugh – Castle Howard (1699–1712); Blenheim Palace (1705–1724)
 James Gibbs – Radcliffe Camera, Oxford (1739–49)

The Netherlands

 Jacob Van Campen – Royal Palace of Amsterdam (then city hall) (begun 1648), Noordeinde Palace (1640) and Mauritshuis (1641)
 Lieven de Key – City Hall (Haarlem) (1620)
 Pieter Post – Huis ten Bosch (1645–1652) and Maastricht City Hall (1686)
 Maurits Post – Soestdijk Palace (1650)
 Daniël Stalpaert – Het Scheepvaartmuseum (1655–1656}
 Daniel Marot – Het Loo Palace (1684–1686))
 Bartholomeus van Bassen – Nieuwe Kerk (The Hague) (1656)
 Pierre Cuypers – Oudenbosch Basilica (1892)

Germany

 Agostino Barelli – Nymphenburg Palace, Munich (1664–1675)
 Matthäus Daniel Pöppelmann – Zwinger, Dresden (1697–1716)
 Georg Bahr – Dresden Frauenkirche, (1722–1738, destroyed in 1944, rebuilt in 1994–2005)
 Johann Arnold Nering – Charlottenburg Palace, Berlin (1695–1713) 
 Balthasar Neumann – Basilica of the Fourteen Holy Helpers (1743–1772), Würzburg Residence (1735)
 Johann Dientzenhofer and Johann Lukas von Hildebrandt – Schloss Weißenstein in Pommersfelden, Bavaria (1711–1718)
 Augustusburg Palace

Austria 
 Johann Lukas von Hildebrandt, Upper Belvedere Palace in Vienna (1721–23)
 Johann Bernhard Fischer von Erlach – University Church, Salzburg (begun 1696); Karlskirche, Vienna (1716–37); Austrian National Library (begun 1722)
 Johann Bernhard Fischer von Erlach and Johann Lukas von Hildebrandt – Palais Auersperg in Vienna
 Jakob Prandtauer and Josef Munggenast, Abbey of Melk (1702–1738)
 Santino Solari, Salzburg Cathedral (Facade and interior of dome) (1614–1628)

Czech Republic 

 Jean-Baptiste Mathey – Troja Palace, Prague (1679–1691)
 Christoph Dientzenhofer – Břevnov Monastery, Prague (1708–1721) – Church of St Nicholas.  Prague (1704–55)
 Kilian Ignaz Dientzenhofer – Kinský Palace (Prague) (1755–1765)

Slovakia
 Pietro Spozzo – Jesuit Church of Trnava (1629–37)

Hungary
 András Mayerhoffer – Gödöllő Palace near Budapest (begun 1733)
 Ignác Oraschek and Márton Wittwer: Esterházy Palace in Fertőd

Romania

 Johann Eberhard Blaumann – Bánffy Palace in Cluj (1774–75)
 Johann Lukas von Hildebrandt – Bishopric Palace in Oradea. (1736–1750)
 Joseph Emanuel Fischer von Erlach – St. George's Cathedral of Timișoara 
 Anton Erhard Martinelli – Holy Trinity Cathedral of Blaj (1738–1749)
 Samuel von Brukenthal – Brukenthal Palace in Sibiu (1777–87)
 Franz Burger – Brukenthal High School in Sibiu (1779–81)                            
 Roman Catholic Church of Sibiu (1726–33)
 Gheorghe Lazăr National College of Sibiu

Poland

 Giovanni Maria Bernardoni – Saints Peter and Paul Church, Kraków (1597–1619)
 Joseph Emanuel Fischer von Erlach – Chapel of the Holy Sacrament, Wroclaw Cathedral
 Karl Friedrich Pöppelmann – Blue Palace in Warsaw (1728)
 Tylman van Gameren – Krasinski Palace, Warsaw (1677–1682)
 Johann Lukas von Hildebrandt – Wroclaw Palace, Warsaw (1711)
 Friedrich Karcher – Enlargement of Royal Castle, Warsaw (1700)
 Augustyn Wincenty Locci and Andreas Schlüter – Reconstruction of Wilanów Palace (1677–1696)

Portugal

 João Antunes – Church of Santa Engrácia, Lisbon (now National Pantheon of Portugal; begun 1681)
 Nicolau Nasoni – Clérigos Church in Porto (1732–1763); Mateus Palace in Vila Real (1739–1743)

Portuguese Colonial Baroque

 Aleijadinho – church of São Francisco in Ouro Preto, Brazil (1771–1794)
 Basilica and Convent of Nossa Senhora do Carmo in Recife, Brazil (1665–1767)
 Church of St. Anne in Goa, India (1577–1695)
 Church of Saint Dominic, Macau, China (1587)

Spain

 Fernando de Casas Novoa – West facade of Cathedral of Santiago de Compostela (1738–1750)
 Alonzo Cano – Baroque additions to Granada Cathedral (1667)
 Leonardo de Figueroa – College of San Telmo, Seville, (1682)
 Jose Benito de Churriguera – San Cayetano Church, Madrid – Altar of the Church of San Esteban, Salamanca (1693)
 Francisco Hurtado Izquierdo – Granada Charterhouse, Granada (1727–1764)

Spanish American Baroque

 Lorenzo Rodriguez – Metropolitan Tabernacle of Mexico City Metropolitan Cathedral, Mexico (1749–1760)
 Cathedral Basilica of Zacatecas in Zacatecas City, Mexico (1729–1772)
 Spaniard José de la Cruz, Antonio de Nava and Luigi Tomassi – Cathedral of Chihuahua, Mexico, (1725–1760)
Convent of San Francisco, Mexico City, built around the 16th century
 Flemish Jean-Baptiste Gilles and Diego Martínez de Oviedo – Iglesia de la Compañía de Jesús in Cusco, Peru (1668)
 Juan Miguel de Veramendi, Juan Correa, Miguel Gutiérrez Sencio – Cusco Cathedral, in Cusco, Peru (1560–1664)
Palacio de Torre Tagle, in Lima, Peru (1715)
Lima Cathedral, in Lima, Peru (1535–1649)
Basilica and Convent of Nuestra Señora de la Merced, in Lima, Peru (1535)
 Basilica of San Francisco in La Paz, Bolivia (1743–1772)
 Havana Cathedral in Cuba, built between 1748 and 1777
 Basilica Menor de San Francisco de Asís in Havana, Cuba, built between 1580 and 1738.

Nordic Countries

 Elias David Häusser (Denmark) – Christiansborg Palace (1st)
 Lambert van Haven (Denmark) – Church of Our Saviour, Copenhagen (1682–1747)
 Nicodemus Tessin the Elder (Sweden) – Drottningholm Palace (1662–1681) – Kalmar Cathedral in Småland, Sweden (1660–1703)

Russia

 Giovanni Maria Fontana – Menshikov Palace in Saint Petersburg (1710–1720s)
 Georg Johann Mattarnovi – Kunstkamera in Petrine Baroque, Saint Petersburg, completed by 1727
 Bartolomeo Francesco Rastrelli – Facade of Smolny Convent, Saint Petersburg (1748–1754); Stroganov Palace (1753—1754); Vorontsov Palace (Saint Petersburg) (1749—1757); Winter Palace in Saint Petersburg (1754–1762)
 Domenico Trezzini – Peter and Paul Fortress, Saint Petersburg (1706–1740)
 Mikhail Zemtsov – Transfiguration Cathedral (Saint Petersburg) (1743–54)

Turkey

 Nuruosmaniye Mosque (1749–1755)

Ukraine

 Mariinskyi Palace in Kyiv (1744–1752) by Francesco Bartolomeo Rastrelli
 St Andrew's Church, Kyiv (1744–1767) by Francesco Bartolomeo Rastrelli
 Portions of Kyiv Pechersk Lavra (17th–18th century)
 Portions of Vydubychi Monastery (17th 18th century)

Malta 

Bontadino de Bontadini – Wignacourt Aqueduct (1612–1615) and Wignacourt Arch
 Francesco Bounamici – Church of the Jesuits in Valletta (1635) 
 Mattia Preti – Saint John's Co-Cathedral (1660s); Church of Our Lady of Victories (1752)
 Lorenzo Gafà – Church of St. Lawrence in Birgu (1681–97); St. Paul's Cathedral in Mdina (1696–1705); the Cathedral of the Assumption in Victoria, Gozo (1697–1711)
 Andrea Belli – Auberge de Castille (1741–45)

See also 

 List of Baroque architecture
 List of Baroque residences
 Baroque music
 Baroque sculpture

References

Bibliography 
Bailey, Gauvin Alexander. Baroque & Rococo. London: Phaidon Press, 2012.
 

Ducher, Robert, Caractéristique des Styles, (1988), Flammarion, Paris (In French); 
 

 

Robbins Landon, H. C. and David Wyn Jones (1988) Haydn:  His Life and Music.  Thames and Hudson.

External links 

 Siberian Baroque

 
Architectural styles
Architectural history
16th-century architecture
17th-century architecture
18th-century architectural styles
16th century in the arts
17th century in the arts
18th century in the arts
Architecture
Architecture in Italy